Ant & Sami Lukis was an Australian drive radio show with Ant Simpson (Ant) & Sami Lukis. It was formerly broadcast on Mix 106.5 and Mix 101.1 from 4pm to 7pm on weekdays.

History
Anthony Simpson (Ant) & Anthony Toohey (Becks) started in regional radio with a show called The Benchwarmers, initially in the breakfast slot on Star FM in Gippsland. In 2007, they were networked in the drive shift on Southern Cross Media Group's Sea FM, Star FM and Hot FM stations, with Becks broadcasting from the Gold Coast and Ant based in Melbourne.

In November 2009, Simpson & Toohey were poached by the Australian Radio Network to present Drive and commenced broadcasting in January 2010.

In April 2012, Toohey announced that he had resigned from the show to pursue overseas projects. The show continues with Simpson and new co-host Sami Lukis, with the show now called "Ant & Sami Lukis"

In December 2012, Australian Radio Network announced that Sami Lukis has been appointed breakfast presenter on Mix 106.5 with Yumi Stynes in 2013 with Ant leaving the station. Tim Ross became host of the drive show for 2013.

References

External links
Ant & Sami Lukis

Australian radio programs